"Walk with Us" is the twelfth episode of the tenth season of the post-apocalyptic horror television series The Walking Dead, which aired on AMC on March 15, 2020. The episode was written by Nicole Mirante-Matthews and Eli Jorne, and directed by Greg Nicotero.

Following the attack on the Hilltop, led by Alpha (Samantha Morton), alongside Negan (Jeffrey Dean Morgan), the Whisperers lead a massive horde of walkers into the settlement while the survivors are forced to fall back.

Plot
As the battle between the Hilltop and the Whisperers rages, the sheer volume of walkers slowly begins overwhelming the survivors, compounded by the Whisperers setting much of the community ablaze. The survivors begin to retreat when the Whisperers destroy one of the Hilltop's walls. Judith kills a Whisperer she believed to be a walker, shaking her as this is the first human life she has taken; she and the other children are ushered away by Earl. Eugene recovers the radio he was using to contact Stephanie from Barrington House, while Yumiko is shocked to see Magna camouflaged amongst the horde.

The next morning, Alpha tells Negan that she will not consider the battle a victory until she has regained Lydia. Negan subsequently stumbles upon Aaron, who reacts in anger to Negan switching sides, but retreats when walkers start to close in. Negan then proceeds to find Lydia in the woods and captures her, tying her up in a cabin, while the other survivors migrate toward planned rendezvous points. When Mary, Alden, Kelly, and Adam are confronted by walkers, Mary lures them away only to be killed by Beta, ripping off part of Beta's mask before she dies; Beta then kills a Whisperer who recognizes him from before the apocalypse. Elsewhere, Magna tells Yumiko that she and Connie were separated while the herd was being moved out of the cavern, and the pair decide to end their relationship on mutual terms after Yumiko punches Carol for causing Magna and Connie's predicament.

Meanwhile, Earl hides the children in a cottage as he prepares to kill himself, having been bitten during the battle. However, his suicide attempt fails to destroy his brain, forcing Judith to put down his reanimated body afterward. A group of survivors later arrive to retrieve the children after finding Ezekiel; Daryl comforts the despondent Judith.

In the woods, Negan reports to Alpha that he has found Lydia. He tries to talk her out of killing her own daughter, relating the story of how his late wife Lucille died from cancer. However, Alpha insists she believes this is the only thing she can do for her daughter for failing to become a Whisperer. As Lydia struggles free of her restraints, Negan leads Alpha to a nearby cabin, but it is soon revealed that Lydia is not in it. A confused Alpha turns to Negan, who then slits her throat while her guard is down, killing her. Negan then delivers Alpha's severed, reanimated head to Carol, who is pleased.

Production

"Walk with Us" features the death of Alpha (Samantha Morton) at the hands of Negan (Jeffrey Dean Morgan) which resembles her death from an issue adapted from the comic book series. It also features the final appearances of Gamma / Mary (Thora Birch) and Earl Sutton (John Finn), who are both killed in this episode.

During an interview with Dalton Ross for Entertainment Weekly, Morton said the following about her character's death:

In an interview with Kirsten Acuna for Insider, Morton also revealed the following about Alpha's death:

In an interview with Josh Wigler for The Hollywood Reporter, showrunner Angela Kang clarified the following about Alpha's fate:

During an interview for Entertainment Weekly, Kang explained the following about Alpha's death:

Reception

Critical reception

"Walk with Us" received critical acclaim. On Rotten Tomatoes, the episode has an approval rating of 94% with an average score of 8.10 out of 10, based on 18 reviews. The site's critical consensus reads: "Following a swift and violent conclusion to last week's harrowing battle, 'Walk With Us' delivers a restless aftermath marked by stunning characters deaths and unanticipated twists."

Noetta Harjo of Geek Girl Authority praised the episode, writing: "This season is just getting better. I was on the edge of my seat throughout this episode of The Walking Dead. RIP Mary aka Gamma and Earl. RIP Alpha?" Writing for The A.V. Club, Alex McLevy gave the episode a C+ and wrote: "It started great and ended even better; if only there weren't that whole episode in between to drag it down." Conversely, Jeff Stone of IndieWire gave the episode an A−, writing: "There are a few too many holes for the episode to be a complete success, but it's another very strong showing in a half-season that's had way more good than bad."

Forbes Erik Kain noted the following: "The second part of the Hilltop battle was almost as great as the first part. It's pretty cool to see The Walking Dead go this big with a battle scene and really pull it off." Writing for Den of Geek, Ron Hogan gave the episode 4 out of 5 stars and wrote: "Solid performances abound, with [Jeffrey Dean] Morgan and Samantha Morton continuing to be spectacular." Matt Fowler of IGN gave the episode an 8 out of 10, writing: "It was paced and plotted out in a bizarre way that left us asking questions... Some mid-card character deaths, and a big final twist that took down the major villain, helped elevate it in the end." Writing for Pajiba, Brian Richards praised the episode and wrote: "A very impressive episode that helped bring an end to Samantha Morton's time as Alpha, who was one of the very best things about the show these last couple of seasons."

Ratings
"Walk with Us" received 3.49 million viewers, up from the previous episode's rating.

References

External links

"Walk with Us" at AMC

2020 American television episodes
The Walking Dead (season 10) episodes